Carbonic anhydrase 14 is an enzyme that in humans is encoded by the CA14 gene.

Carbonic anhydrases (CAs) are a large family of zinc metalloenzymes that catalyze the reversible hydration of carbon dioxide.  They participate in a variety of biological processes, including respiration, calcification, acid-base balance, bone resorption, and the formation of aqueous humor, cerebrospinal fluid, saliva, and gastric acid.  They show extensive diversity in tissue distribution and in their subcellular localization.  CA XIV is predicted to be a type I membrane protein and shares highest sequence similarity with the other transmembrane CA isoform, CA XII; however, they have different patterns of tissue-specific expression and thus may play different physiologic roles.

In melanocytic cells CA14 gene expression may be regulated by MITF.

References

External links

Further reading